Souleymane Diallo (Arabic: سليمان ديالو; born 2 December 1987) is a Mauritanian professional footballer who plays as a goalkeeper.

Notes

References 

1987 births
Living people
People from Nouakchott
Mauritanian footballers
Association football goalkeepers
ASAC Concorde players
FC Tevragh-Zeina players
FC Nouadhibou players
Super D1 players
Mauritania international footballers